Sleep No More may refer to:

Sleep No More (2011 play), performed since 2011 in New York City
Sleep No More (2009 play)
Sleep No More (novel), a 2002 novel by Greg Iles
Sleep No More (anthology), a 1944 anthology edited by August Derleth
Sleep No More (The Comsat Angels album), 1981
Sleep No More (DJ Signify album), 2004
Sleep No More (Jack Savoretti album), 2016
"Sleep No More" (Doctor Who), an episode of the ninth series of Doctor Who
"Sleep No More," an episode from the fifth season of Arthur
Sleep No More, a 1948 collection of supernatural horror stories by L. T. C. Rolt
Sleep No More, a 1966 book by George Sims as Paul Cain (pen name)

Shakespearean phrases